Allium wallichii is a plant species native to India, Nepal, Sikkim, Bhutan, Myanmar, and parts of China (Guangxi, Guizhou, Hunan, Sichuan, Tibet, Xizang, Yunnan). It grows at elevations of 2300–4800 m.

Allium wallichii has elongate roots and clusters of narrow bulbs. Scapes are up to 110 cm tall, triangular in cross-section. Leaves are flat, up to 20 mm across, usually shorter than the scape. Flowers are white, pink, red, dark purple (sometimes almost black).

Varieties
Two varieties of the species are generally accepted:

Allium wallichii var. wallichii  --- Leaves not narrowed into a petiole at the base

Allium wallichii var. platyphyllum (Diels) J.M.Xu	--- Leaves not narrowed into a petiole at the base ---  found only in Yunnan

References

wallichii
Onions
Flora of Sichuan
Flora of Guangxi
Flora of Guizhou
Flora of Hunan
Flora of Yunnan
Flora of the Indian subcontinent
Flora of Myanmar
Flora of Tibet
Plants described in 1843